Siissisoq was a Greenlandic heavy metal band, formed in 1994. The name Siissisoq means Rhino in Greenlandic. The band's lyrics are sung in Greenlandic and their songs are mainly named after African animals. During their original incarnation they were considered the most popular rock band in Greenland.

History 
Siissisoq formed in 1994 in their hometown of Uummannaq. Guitarist Karl Enok Mathiassen started writing riffs inspired by Metallica and White Zombie. Guitarist Jens Thorin was the first additional member of the new band. Karl Enok Mathiassen started writing songs at age 15, and several of his early songs ended up on the first Siissisoq album.

They released their first album, Aammarpassuillu, in 1998, and it stayed at number one on the Greenlandic charts for two months. In 2001, the band released the live album Aammarlussuillu Live. Their second studio album Super Day was released in 2002 but was not as successful as the first album. The band then went on an extended hiatus. 

Siissisoq learned that their record label, ULO Records, had engaged in fraud and manipulation and only paid the band 3-4% of the income earned from their work. ULO claimed that there was not enough of a profit to give Siissisoq money.

The band played reunion shows in 2010 at the Nuuk Festival and the Nipiaa Rock Festival, and have performed live sporadically since then. The album Black Box, compiling live tracks and new recordings of older songs, was released in 2018. Today Karl Enok Mathiassen has his own record label and radio company.

Past members
Karl Enok Mathiassen - Lead Guitar, songwriting
Hans Mathiassen - Vocals, bass guitar
Knud Mathiassen - Vocals
Malik Løvstrøm  - Drums
Ilannguaq Mathiassen - Guitar

Hans Therkildsen - Bass
Jens Samuelsen - Vocals
Villads Kristiansen - Drums
Peter Fleischer - Drums
Jens Thorin - Guitar
Peter Hendriksen - Bass
Rasmus Petersen - Bass
Jens Koch Kristensen - Bass

Discography 
Aammarpassuillu (1998)
Aammarpassuillu Live (2001)
Super Day (2002)
Black Box (compilation, 2018)

References

External links 
Official Biography in English
Siissisoq at Tartarean Desire

Greenlandic rock music groups
Greenlandic heavy metal musical groups
Musical groups established in 1994
People from Uummannaq